Jeshbab the Scribe (or Yeshbab the Scribe, Yəšēḇāḇ haSōfēr) was a third generation Jewish Tanna sage, at the beginning of the 2nd century. He was a disciple of Joshua ben Hananiah and a colleague of Rabbi Akiva.

The name is also sometimes spelled Jeshebeab.

Jeshbab was benevolent, and had handed out all his property to the needy, a deed that was not viewed with favour by his colleagues. Once he wished to hand a fifth of his property to the needy, and R. Akiva ben Joseph did not allow him to do so.

Jeshbab is accounted among the Ten Martyrs.

References

Mishnah rabbis
Jewish scribes (soferim)
Jewish martyrs
People executed by the Roman Empire
2nd-century rabbis